The  of companies centers on the Nagoya Railroad railway company, which links Nagoya and its suburbs. Many companies in the group are designed to enhance the value of the Meitetsu rail network. In addition to the railroad system, the group includes other companies in transportation, real-estate, retail, leisure, and cultural endeavors. Here is a partial list of companies in the Meitetsu Group.

Transportation
Meitetsu
Toyohashi Railroad
Hokuriku Railroad
Ōigawa Railway
Meitetsu Bus
Meitetsu Kanko Bus
Gifu Bus
Chita Noriai
Meitetsu Taxi
Meitetsu Unyu
Taiheiyō Ferry
Ontake Kotsu
Miyagi Kotsu
Abashiri Bus

Real estate 
Meitetsu Real Estate

Retail 
Meitetsu Department Stores 
Meitetsu Yakuhin
Kanazawa Meitetsu Marukoshi Department Store
Pare Marche

Leisure 
Meitetsu Grand Hotel
Gifu Grand Hotel
Meitetsu Inuyama Hotel
Joan
Meitetsu Impress
Meiji Mura
Japan Monkey Park
Sugimoto Museum
Little World Museum of Man
Minamichita Beach Land
Komagatake Ropeway
Shinhotaka Ropeway

External links

Meitetsu Group